The 2015 Challenger Pulcra Lachiter Biella was a professional tennis tournament played on outdoor red clay courts. It was part of the 2015 ATP Challenger Tour. It took place in Biella, Italy between 27 July – 2 August 2015.

Entrants

Seeds

 Rankings are as of July 20, 2015.

Other entrants
The following players received wildcards into the singles main draw:
  Salvatore Caruso
  Alessandro Giannessi
  Stefano Napolitano
  Gianluigi Quinzi

The following players received entry as special exemptions:
  Thiemo de Bakker 
  Nikoloz Basilashvili

The following player entered with a protected ranking:
  Pedro Sousa
 
The following players received entry from the qualifying draw:
  Marco Bortolotti
  Bastián Malla
  João Menezes
  Fabrício Neis

The following player entered as a lucky loser:
  Agustín Velotti

Champions

Singles

 Andrej Martin def.  Nicolás Kicker 6–2, 6–2

Doubles

 Andrej Martin /  Hans Podlipnik Castillo def.  Alexandru-Daniel Carpen /  Dino Marcan 7–5, 1–6, [10–8]

External links
Official website
ITF search

Canella Challenger
Tennis tournaments in Italy